Chelutay (24 km) (Shuluuta (24 km)) is a rural locality (a settlement) in Zaigrayevsky District, Republic of Buryatia, Russia. The population was 1,053 as of 2010. There are 16 streets.

Geography 
Chelutay (24 km) is located 16 km southeast of Zaigrayevo (the district's administrative centre) by road. Chelutay is the nearest rural locality.

References 

Rural localities in Zaigrayevsky District